Glasbach may refer to:

Glasbach, a small river of North Rhine-Westphalia, Germany, tributary of the Wupper
Glasbach (Main), a river of Bavaria, Germany, tributary of the Main
Glasbach (Moosbach), a small river in the suburb Herdern of Freiburg, Baden-Württemberg, Germany
Mellenbach-Glasbach, Glasbach is one part of this municipality in Thuringia, Germany